Asif Mammadov (born on 5 August 1986) is an Azerbaijani professional footballer who plays for Gabala FK in the Azerbaijan Premier League.

Career

Club
On 10 June 2015, Mammadov signed for Gabala FK.

International
On 23 March 2018, Mammadov made his senior international debut for Azerbaijan game against Belarus.

Career statistics

Club

International

Statistics accurate as of match played 23 March 2018

Honours
Gabala
 Azerbaijan Cup: 2018–19

References

External links
 

1986 births
Living people
Azerbaijani footballers
Azerbaijan international footballers
Shamakhi FK players
Khazar Lankaran FK players
Gabala FC players
Azerbaijan Premier League players
Association football midfielders
Footballers from Agdam